Martin Thomsen (born October 31, 1980) is a retired Danish professional football defender. He has previously played in the Danish Superliga with SønderjyskE.

External links
 Danish Superliga statistics

Living people
1980 births
Danish men's footballers
SønderjyskE Fodbold players
Kolding IF players
Danish Superliga players
Danish 1st Division players

Association football defenders